Switzerland competed at the 2020 Summer Olympics in Tokyo. Originally scheduled to take place from 24 July to 9 August 2020, the Games were postponed to 23 July to 8 August 2021, because of the COVID-19 pandemic. Swiss athletes have appeared in every edition of the Summer Olympic Games in the modern era, except for a partial boycott of the 1956 Summer Olympics in Melbourne in protest at the Soviet invasion of Hungary.

Switzerland not only repeated its gold medal tally from the previous games but also increased its overall medal tally from 7 medals last time to 13 medals. They won medals in double digit for the first time since 1952 Helsinki.

Competitors
The following is the list of number of competitors in the Games.

Medalists

| width="78%" align="left" valign="top" |

| width="22%" align="left" valign="top" |

Athletics

Swiss athletes further achieved the entry standards, either by qualifying time or by world ranking, in the following track and field events (up to a maximum of 3 athletes in each event):

Track & road events
Men

Women

Field events

Badminton

Switzerland entered one badminton player into the Olympic tournament based on the BWF Race to Tokyo Rankings. Sabrina Jaquet will be competing in her third straight Olympics.

Canoeing

Slalom
Swiss canoeists qualified one boat for each of the following classes through the 2019 ICF Canoe Slalom World Championships in La Seu d'Urgell, Spain and the 2021 European Canoe Slalom Championships in Ivrea, Italy. The slalom canoeists were named to the Swiss team on November 11, 2019.The Africa quota was initially reallocated to Hungary, but was further reallocated to Switzerland following the Hungarian Olympic Committee's decision to only send athletes vaccinated against COVID-19 to the Games.

Cycling

Road
Switzerland entered a squad of five riders (four men and one woman) to compete in their respective Olympic road races, by virtue of their top 50 national finish (for men) and top 22 (for women) in the UCI World Ranking.

Track
Following the completion of the 2020 UCI Track Cycling World Championships, Swiss riders accumulated spots in the men's team pursuit, omnium, and madison based on their country's results in the final UCI Olympic rankings. The Swiss Olympic Association announced the track cycling squad for the Games on May 12, 2021.

Pursuit

Omnium

Madison

Mountain biking
Switzerland qualified six mountain bikers, three man and three women, based on the UCI Olympic Mountain Biking rankings.

BMX
Swiss riders qualified for three quota place (two men and one women) for BMX at the Olympics, as a result in the UCI BMX Olympic Qualification Ranking List of 1 June 2021.

Race

Freestyle

Diving

Switzerland sent one diver into the Olympic competition, after finishing the top 18 in the women's springboard at the 2021 FINA Diving World Cup in Tokyo, Japan.

Equestrian

Swiss equestrians qualified a full squad in the jumping competition by virtue of a top-six finish at the 2018 FEI World Equestrian Games in Tryon, North Carolina, United States. A team of eventing riders was added to the Swiss equestrian roster by securing an outright berth, as the highest-ranked eligible nation, not yet qualified, in the 2019 Eventing Nations Cup overall rankings. MeanwhIle, one dressage rider was added to the Swiss roster by finishing in the top two, outside the group selection, of the individual FEI Olympic Rankings for Group B (South Western Europe).

Dressage

Qualification Legend: Q = Qualified for the final; q = Qualified for the final as a lucky loser

Eventing
The Swiss eventing team was named on July 1, 2021. Eveline Bodenmüller and Violine de la Brasserie have been named the travelling alternates.

(s) – substituted before jumping – 20 replacement penalties

Jumping
Bryan Balsiger and Twentytwo des Biches have been named the travelling alternates.

Fencing

Swiss fencers qualified a full squad each in the men's team épée for the Games by finishing among the top four nations in the FIE Olympic Team Rankings.

Golf

Switzerland entered two female golfers into the Olympic tournament. Morgane Métraux qualified but chose not to play. Kim Métraux gained a late place.

Gymnastics

Artistic
Switzerland fielded a full team of five artistic gymnasts (four men and one woman) into the Olympic competition. The men's squad claimed one of the remaining nine spots in the team all-around, while Rio 2016 vault bronze medalist Giulia Steingruber set her third straight trip to the Games, by finishing second out of twenty qualified gymnasts in the individual all-around and apparatus events at the 2019 World Championships in Stuttgart, Germany. The men's team was announced on 24 June 2021.

Men
Team

Individual

Women
Individual

Judo
 
Switzerland entered two judoka (one men and one women) into the Olympic tournament based on the International Judo Federation Olympics Individual Ranking.

Karate
 
Switzerland entered one karateka into the inaugural Olympic tournament. Elena Quirici qualified directly for the women's kumite +61 kg category by finishing top three at 2021 World Olympic Qualification Tournament in Paris, France.

Rowing

Switzerland qualified four boats for each of the following rowing classes into the Olympic regatta, with the majority of crews confirming Olympic places for their boats at the 2019 FISA World Championships in Ottensheim, Austria.

Men

Women

Qualification Legend: FA=Final A (medal); FB=Final B (non-medal); FC=Final C (non-medal); FD=Final D (non-medal); FE=Final E (non-medal); FF=Final F (non-medal); SA/B=Semifinals A/B; SC/D=Semifinals C/D; SE/F=Semifinals E/F; QF=Quarterfinals; R=Repechage

Sailing

Swiss sailors qualified one boat in each of the following classes through the 2018 Sailing World Championships, the class-associated Worlds, and the continental regattas. Additionally, they received an unused berth from Oceania to send the women's 470 crew to the Games based on the results at the 2019 World Championships.

On June 2, 2020, the Swiss Sailing selected Rio 2016 windsurfer Mateo Sanz Lanz, along with skiff crew Lucien Cujean and Sébastien Schneiter, to compete at the Enoshima regatta. The women's 470 crew Linda Fahrni and Maja Siegenthaler was officially named to the Swiss sailing roster on April 1, 2021, while Laser Radial sailor Maud Jayet completed the lineup one month later.

M = Medal race; EL = Eliminated – did not advance into the medal race

Shooting

Swiss shooters achieved quota places for the following events by virtue of their best finishes at the 2018 ISSF World Championships, the 2019 ISSF World Cup series, European Championships or Games, and European Qualifying Tournament, as long as they obtained a minimum qualifying score (MQS) by May 31, 2020.

Sport climbing

Switzerland entered one sport climber into the Olympic tournament. Petra Klingler qualified directly for the women's combined event, by advancing to the final and securing one of the seven provisional berths at the 2019 IFSC World Championships in Hachioji, Japan.

Swimming 

Swiss swimmers further achieved qualifying standards in the following events (up to a maximum of 2 swimmers in each event at the Olympic Qualifying Time (OQT), and potentially 1 at the Olympic Selection Time (OST)):

Men

Women

Table tennis

For the first time since Atlanta 1996, Switzerland entered an athlete into the table tennis competition at the Games, based on the World Rankings as of June 1, 2021.

Tennis

Triathlon

Switzerland qualified for the Mixed Relay events by finishing third at the 2021 World Triathlon Mixed Relay Olympic Qualification Event in Lisbon on May 21, 2021.

Individual

Relay

Volleyball

Beach
Swiss women's beach volleyball pair qualified for the Games, as the result in the FIVB Beach volleyball Olympic Ranking List of 13 June 2021.

Wrestling

For the first time since London 2012, Switzerland qualified one wrestler for the men's freestyle 86 kg into the Olympic competition, as a result of his top six finish at the 2019 World Championships.

Freestyle

References

Nations at the 2020 Summer Olympics
2020
2021 in Swiss sport